The Story of Colors (La Historia de los Colores)  is a children's book written by Subcomandante Marcos of the Zapatista Army of National Liberation. First published in 1996, it generated controversy after the National Endowment for the Arts canceled grant money for an illustrated bilingual edition in both Spanish and English. The Lannan Foundation stepped in with support after the NEA withdrew. The bilingual version was published in 1999, translated by Anne Bar Din with illustrations by Domitilia Dominguez.

In 2000, the book received the Children's Book Award from the Firecracker Alternative Book Award. After the NEA withdrew its support, National Public Radio featured the book on All Things Considered, as did The Nation and The New York Times.

References 

1999 children's books
Picture books
Mexican books
Spanish-language books
Cinco Puntos Press books